The BMW S65 is a naturally aspirated V8 petrol engine which was produced from 2007 to 2013. Its main use was in the BMW M3 (where it replaced the BMW S54 straight-six engine). There is no direct replacement for the S65, since the following generation of M3 switched to a turbocharged straight-six engine (the BMW S55).

Derived from the BMW S85 V10 engine (as used in the E60 M5), the S65 shares the same basic architecture and aluminium construction. Unlike most other BMW M engines, the S65 and S85 are not related to a regular production BMW engine.

The S65 won the International Engine of the Year award for the 3.0 to 4.0 L category in 2008, 2009, 2010, 2011 and 2012.



Design

The S65 shares the same cylinder dimensions with the S85 V10, with a  bore and a  stroke. Other common features include individual throttle bodies, ionic current knock sensing, double-VANOS (variable valve timing) and the 12.0:1 compression ratio. The redline is 8,400 rpm.

To reduce weight, a wet-sump lubrication system with two electrically operated scavenging pumps and a main oil pump replaces the three-pump wet-sump system used on the S85.

The alternator reduces or stops charging (depending on battery charge level) during acceleration to maximise power, only fully charging the battery during braking and decelerating whenever possible, in a system BMW calls Brake Energy Regeneration.

The engine control unit (ECU/DME) is a Siemens MSS60, which is based on the Siemens MSS65 ECU used in the S85 engine
The S65 weighs , which is  less than its S54 straight-6 engine predecessor.

The firing order for the S65 engine is 1-5-4-8-7-2-6-3, which is different from the typical BMW V8 firing order of 1-5-4-8-6-3-7-2.

Versions

S65B40

Applications:
 2008-2013 BMW E90/92/93 M3
 2009-2014 Wiesmann MF4-S

S65B44
It also uses a lightweight titanium exhaust.

Applications:
 2010-2011 BMW E92 M3 GTS
 2011-2012 BMW E90 M3 CRT sedan

P65
The P65 engine is used for motor racing.

Applications:

P65B40 
 2008 BMW M3 ALMS
 2009 BMW M3 GT2 racing car

P65B44 
 2010-2015 BMW Z4 GT3 racing car
 2013-2016 BMW Z4 GTE racing car

See also

 List of BMW engines

References

S65
V8 engines
Gasoline engines by model